Transport Nagar may refer to: 

 Transport Nagar, Madurai, a residential area in Madurai district
 Transport Nagar, Erode, a residential area in Erode district